"A Dangerous Maid" is the third episode of the second season of the HBO television series Boardwalk Empire and 15th episode overall. First aired on October 9, 2011, it was written by Itamar Moses and directed by Susanna White.

Plot 

Nucky reaches out to various sources for help in fighting the legal charges against him. To his dismay, many that he formerly did favours for are now turning a blind eye to his predicament. Capone visits Atlantic City to end Torrio's bootlegging arrangements with Nucky. Irishman Owen Sleater offers his services to Nucky. Richard Harrow is on a job for Jimmy, selling alcohol to one of Nucky's clients. Sleater informs the client that Harrow doesn't work for Nucky, and engages in a fight with Harrow's men. After a brief standoff, both men withdraw.
Nucky publicly confronts Jimmy and the Commodore with an open declaration of war.
Rothstein talks with Joe Masseria, a local Mafia don, over a dispute with Luciano and Lansky, which is largely based on the deaths of two of Masseria's nephews- the two men Jimmy killed while visiting Rothstein. Rothstein orders his men to pay compensation to Masseria.
An increasingly bored, depressed and pregnant Lucy contemplates throwing herself down the stairs after Van Alden forbids her to try out for an upcoming musical. Later, Van Alden sends her a record player and this noticeably lifts her spirits.
Margaret receives word that her estranged family from Ireland are now living in America. She unsuccessfully attempts to contact one of them. Margaret becomes friendly with her maid. But when her maid claims to know that Margaret is really 'Peggy Rohan', Margaret coldly disengages from the conversation.

Title
A Dangerous Maid is a musical by George and Ira Gershwin.  The script for it is given to Lucy by her friend Eddie Cantor.

Reception

Critical reception 
IGN gave the episode a score of 7.5 out of 10, saying that it had "... a very slow burn of a narrative that spends more time filling in backstory of certain female characters than it did pushing the Nucky vs. Commodore conflict forward." The A.V. Club rated the episode a "B+".

Ratings 
The episode was watched by 2.856 million viewers. It was up a tenth with adults 18–49 in its third week, rising to 1.2 million in the 18-49 rating.

References

External links 
  "A Dangerous Maid" at HBO.com
 

2011 American television episodes
Boardwalk Empire episodes